Shams Khan (also Romanized as Shams Khān; also known as Shamsī Khān Qal‘eh and Shams Khān Qal‘eh) is a village in Zangelanlu Rural District, Lotfabad District, Dargaz County, Razavi Khorasan Province, Iran. At the 2006 census, its population was 294, in 87 families.

References 

Populated places in Dargaz County